Churayevo (Suray) is a rural locality (a village) in Karmyshevsky Selsoviet, Alsheyevsky District, Bashkortostan, Russia. The population was 386 as of 2010. There are 5 streets.

Geography 
Churayevo is located 16 km southeast of Rayevsky (the district's administrative centre) by road. Karmyshevo is the nearest rural locality.

References 

Rural localities in Alsheyevsky District